Princess Margaret School (founded 1955) is a public secondary school in St. John's, Antigua. Its principal is Colin Greene.

History
The Princess Margaret School was Antigua's first public secondary school to be established and opened by Princess Margaret in the year 1955.

Notable alumni
Gaston Browne, Prime Minister of Antigua 
Baldwin Spencer, Former Prime Minister of Antigua
Cejhae Greene, Sprinter
Jamaica Kincaid, Writer, Poet
Rick James, Actor and Politician/Activist

See also
List of schools in Antigua and Barbuda

References

High schools and secondary schools in Antigua and Barbuda
Buildings and structures in St. John's, Antigua and Barbuda
Educational institutions established in 1955
1955 establishments in the British Empire